Julius Schaller (July 13, 1810 – June 21, 1868) was a German philosopher born in Magdeburg.

He studied theology and philosophy at the University of Halle, where in 1834 he received his habilitation. In 1838 he became an associate professor at Halle, where in 1861 he was appointed a full professor.

Schaller was an ardent supporter of Hegel's philosophy, and two of his earlier works, Die Philosophie unserer Zeit (The Philosophy of Our Time, 1837) and Der historische Christus und die Philosophie (The Historical Christ and Philosophy, 1838) were written in defense of Hegelianism.

Publications
Other noted publications by Schaller include:
 Geschichte der Naturphilosophie von Bacon bis auf unsere Zeit (History of nature philosophy, from Bacon to our time), 1841–46
 Vorlesungen über Schleiermacher (Lectures on Schleiermacher), 1844
 Darstellung und Kritik der Philosophie von Ludwig Feuerbach (Presentation and critique of the philosophy of Ludwig Feuerbach), 1847
 Die Phrenologie (Phrenology), 1851
 Seele und Leib (Soul and body), 1855
 Psychologie I (Das Seelenleben des Menschen), (Psychology, the soul lives of humans), 1860

References 
 Zeno.org: translated biography at Eisler: Philosopher's Dictionary
 The New American Cyclopaedia by George Ripley and Charles Anderson

External links
 

19th-century German philosophers
Writers from Magdeburg
Academic staff of the University of Halle
1810 births
1868 deaths
German male writers
Hegelian philosophers